William Grey (sometimes Gray) (died February 1436) was Bishop of London and then Bishop of Lincoln.

Family
William Grey was the fourth son of Sir Thomas Grey (1359 - 26 November 1400) of Heaton near Norham, Northumberland, by his wife, Joan Mowbray (d.1410), the daughter of John de Mowbray, 4th Baron Mowbray (d. 17 June 1368), and Elizabeth de Segrave, daughter and heiress of John de Segrave, 4th Baron Segrave. His paternal grandparents were Sir Thomas Grey (d. 1369) of Heaton, and Margaret, daughter and heiress of William de Presfen (or Pressen).

He had three brothers and a sister:
Sir Thomas Grey, executed for his participation in the Southampton Plot.
John Grey, 1st Earl of Tancarville (d.1421).
Sir Henry Grey of Ketteringham, Norfolk, who married Emme Appleyard.
Maud Grey (1382–1451), who married Sir Robert Ogle (d. 12 August 1436) of Ogle, Northumberland, by whom she had issue.

Life
Previously the Dean of York, Grey was nominated to the see of London on 20 July 1425 and consecrated in May 1426, possibly around the 26th. He was translated to the see of Lincoln on 30 April 1431.

Grey died between 10 February and 18 February 1436.

Citations

References

 
 
 Charles Mosley, editor, Burke's Peerage, Baronetage & Knightage, 107th edition, 3 volumes (Wilmington, Delaware, U.S.A.: Burke's Peerage (Genealogical Books) Ltd, 2003), volume 2, p. 1661.
 
 
 

Year of birth unknown
1436 deaths
Bishops of Lincoln
Bishops of London
Deans of York
15th-century English Roman Catholic bishops
People from Norham